Qarah Bolagh (also Romanized as Qarah Bolāgh and Qareh Bolāgh; also known as Ghareh Bolagh Sardrood and Qara Bulāq) is a village in Sardrud-e Olya Rural District, Sardrud District, Razan County, Hamadan Province, Iran. At the 2006 census, its population was 844, in 167 families.

References 

Populated places in Razan County